Bernard Francis "Skip" O'Brien (August 20, 1950 – April 6, 2011) was an American actor. Although he appeared in such films as 1997's Liar Liar and 2007's The Hitcher, he is perhaps best known for his recurring role as Detective Ray O'Riley from 2000 to 2003 on the American television show CSI.

O'Brien was born in Jersey City, New Jersey, and grew up on the Jersey Shore in Union Beach. After serving in the United States Marine Corps during the Vietnam War, he graduated from Brookdale Community College in 1980. O'Brien spent his career in television and film living in California then moved to Hazlet, New Jersey in 2010. He died on April 6, 2011, at the age of 60.

Filmography

References

External links

1950 births
2011 deaths
American male film actors
American male television actors
People from Hazlet, New Jersey
Male actors from Jersey City, New Jersey
People from Monmouth County, New Jersey